"Retiens la nuit" is a song by French singer Johnny Hallyday from his 1961 studio album Salut les copains. It was also released as an EP (in late 1961 or early 1962) and as a single.

Composition and writing 
The song was written by Charles Aznavour and composed by Georges Garvarentz.

Commercial performance 
In France the single spent nine weeks at no. 1 on the singles sales chart (in March–May 1962).

Track listing 
7-inch single Philips 372 946 PF (1961, France etc.)
 A. "Retiens la nuit"
 B. "Sam'di soir"

7-inch EP Philips 432.739 BE (1962, France etc.)
 A1. "Retiens la nuit" (2:54)
 A2. "Sam'di soir" (3:00)
 B1. "Ya ya twist" (2:27)
 B2. "La faute au twist" (1:50)

Cover versions 
The song has been covered by Charles Aznavour.

References

External links 
 Johnny Hallyday – "Retiens la nuit" (single) at Discogs
 Johnny Hallyday – Retiens la nuit (EP) at Discogs

Songs about nights
1961 songs
1961 singles
1962 EPs
Johnny Hallyday songs
Philips Records singles
Songs written by Charles Aznavour
Songs with music by Georges Garvarentz
Number-one singles in France
Song recordings produced by Lee Hallyday